Stubo may refer to:
 Stubo, Montenegro
 Stubo (Valjevo), Serbia